The men's time trial class C1-3 track cycling event at the 2020 Summer Paralympics took place on 27 August 2021 at the Izu Velodrome, Japan. This combine class (C1-3) under classification C is for cyclists who have impairments that affect their legs, arms, and/or trunk but are still capable to use a standard bicycle. 22 cyclists from 17 nations competed in this event.

Competition format
The competition immediately begins with the finals, where the 23 cyclists will individually in their own heat, compete by doing a time trial basis where the fastest cyclist will win gold, the 2nd fastest a silver, and the 3rd fastest a bronze. The distance of this event is 1000m. A cyclist may have a different official time than their real-time due to this event being a combined class event (C1-3), and some cyclists in their own class may have a disadvantage over other classes (for example due to speed), thus athlete factor was used where those in C1 has 93.46, C2 93.96 and C3 100.00. The time cyclist from class C3 gets will be their official time while those in C1 and 2 can have it lesser due to the factor.

Schedule
All times are Japan Standard Time (UTC+9)

Records
Men's C1 1000m Time Trial

Men's C2 1000m Time Trial

Men's C3 1000m Time Trial

Results

References

Men's time trial C1-3